Valery Mikhailovich Didula (Belorussian. Valery Mikhailovich Dzidzyulya, 24 January 1970, Grodno, Belorussian SSR, USSR) - Soviet and Belarusian guitar virtuoso, composer, arranger, music producer, leader of the DiDuLa band. Performs folk and fusion music with a new age influence.

Biography 
Didula was born in a family of music lovers. The first guitar was given to him by his mother at the age of five. He began to practice and quickly mastered it. At sixteen he wrote his first compositions. He later got a job as a third guitar ensemble "Scarlet Dawns" led by Nikolai Khitrik. Concerts were held in different cities, collective farms and state farms, and then in  restaurants. After graduation school, he entered the radio engineering school

Confirmation of his style 
After the collapse of the ensemble, Didula took up sound engineering in the Grodno song and dance ensemble “White Dew”, where mostly Polish, Belarusian, Ukrainian, gypsy folk dances and motifs played, sang and danced. As part of this team, Didula first went on tour in Europe - in Spain, Italy, Poland, Switzerland, France, Germany. In Spain, he became acquainted with the flamenco style - the traditional Spanish music and dance style, which influenced its final formation (Didula's work traces some passages and rhythms characteristic of flamenco and other Spanish movements, but you can't call this music 100% flamenco). He claims to have been "infected" with this traditional Spanish style of music and dance. “I know the style I'm working in now,” the musician says in one of his interviews, “this is the sound of a classic Spanish instrument with nylon strings and the sound of a tree that fascinates me". "My pulse accelerated when I heard this Spanish music." This style is now my business card." The first DiDuLa "Flamenco" album was released in 2000.

DiDuLa Group 
In 2002, DiDuLa gathered a group of musicians and began touring in Russia and the United States.

DiDuLa Group consists of: percussionists (Michail Drumberg and Andrei Atabekov), keyboard (Khaibula Magomedov), bass (Philip Borodin) and wind instruments (Valery Skladanny and Ramil Mulikov).

Discography

Studio albums 
2000 - Flamenco (Audio CD)

2002 - The road to Baghdad (Audio CD)

2004 - Legend (Audio CD)

2006 - Cave town of inkerman (Audio CD)

2006 - Color Dreams (Audio CD)
2007 - Music of an Unreleased Movie (Audio CD)

2010 - Fragrance (Audio CD)
2012 - Ornamental (Audio CD)

2013 - Once Upon a Time (Audio CD + DVD)

2017 - Aquamarine (Audio CD)

2019 - The Seventh Sense (Audio CD)

2021 - 2021 (Audio CD)

Live albums and videos 

2006 - Live in Moscow (Audio CD, DVD)

2009 - Live in Saint Petersburg (DVD + 2CD)

2009 - Dear Six Strings (film about the group, DVD)

2013 - Live in Kremlin (2DVD + 3CD)

Collections 

2006 - Grand Collection (Audio CD, MP3 CD)

2003 - The Best (also known as Satin Coast) (Audio CD)

2013 - DiDuLa. 100 best songs (MP3 CD)

Production work 

2008 - Denis Asimovich “Hommage to Cheslav Drozdievich”

2012 - Igor Dedusenko “Prayer”

Video clips

References

External links 
 
 Official website DiDuLa
 Discography
 Album on Yandex music
 Album in Itunes
 DiDuLa on website People
 DiDuLa in the encyclopedia of guitarists
 «Дидюля спокойно ходит в булочную с авоськой», Вика Зверева, МКС, 17 октября 2006
 Interview on guitar.ru
 DiDuLa on radio «Эхо Москвы»
 Дидюля читает лекцию «Звук как среда обитания» на телеканале «Дождь» 18.08.2012 г.
 Творческий вечер группы «ДиДюЛя» в мультимедийном центре «РИА Новости» 07.06.2012 г.
 «Дидюля: музыка лечит!» — программа «Говорим и показываем с Леонидом Закошанским» на НТВ, 22.11.12 г.
 

1970 births
Living people
Belarusian guitarists
Belarusian musicians